Hovorelus is a genus of beetles in the family Cerambycidae, containing the following species:

 Hovorelus adiectus Galileo & Martins, 2010
 Hovorelus splendidus Galileo & Monne, 2003

References

Prioninae